Alexander Adum Kwapong,  (born 8 March 1927 – 9 August 2014) was a Ghanaian classicist who was Vice Chancellor of the University of Ghana from 1966 to1975.

References

Akan people
Alumni of Achimota School
Alumni of King's College, Cambridge
1927 births
2014 deaths
Members of the Council of State (Ghana)
Vice-Chancellors of universities in Ghana
Ghanaian Presbyterians
Academic staff of the University of Ghana
Ghanaian Protestants
Vice-Chancellors of the University of Ghana